The Peleng leaf warbler (Phylloscopus suaramerdu) is a species of Old World warbler in the family Phylloscopidae. It was first described in 2020. The species name is derived from "suara merdu" in Indonesian, translating as "melodious voice", referring to the pleasing vocalizations of this bird. This leaf warbler is restricted to the highland forests of western Peleng in the Banggai Archipelago, in Indonesia at elevations above 700m, reaching the highest island altitude above 1000m.

References

Peleng leaf warbler
Endemic birds of Sulawesi
Peleng leaf warbler